Doina Spînu (born 9 May 1957) is a Romanian athlete. She competed in the women's long jump at the 1976 Summer Olympics.

References

1957 births
Living people
Athletes (track and field) at the 1976 Summer Olympics
Romanian female long jumpers
Olympic athletes of Romania
Place of birth missing (living people)